Maggot Brain is the third studio album by the American funk rock band Funkadelic, released by Westbound Records in July 1971. It was produced by band leader George Clinton and recorded at United Sound Systems in Detroit during late 1970 and early 1971. It was the final album recorded by the original Funkadelic lineup; after its release, original members Tawl Ross (guitar), Billy Nelson (bass), and Tiki Fulwood (drums) left the band for various reasons.

The album charted in the R&B Top 20. Today, it is perhaps best known for its 10-minute title track, an improvisation performed by guitarist Eddie Hazel.  Pitchfork named it the 17th best album of the 1970s. In 2020, Rolling Stone ranked Maggot Brain the 136th greatest album of all time in its updated list.

Music and lyrics
The album opens with a spoken word monologue by band leader George Clinton, which refers to "the maggots in the mind of the universe". According to legend, the 10-minute title track was recorded in one take when Clinton, under the influence of LSD, told guitarist Eddie Hazel to play as if he had been told his mother was dead: Clinton instructed him "to picture that day, what he would feel, how he would make sense of his life, how he would take a measure of everything that was inside him and let it out through his guitar". Though several other musicians performed on the track, Clinton largely faded them out of the final mix so that the focus would be on Hazel's guitar. Hazel utilized fuzz and wah effects, inspired by his idol Jimi Hendrix; Clinton subsequently added delay and other effects in mixdown, saying "I Echoplexed it back on itself three or four times. That gave the whole thing an eerie feel, both in the playing and in the sound effects." Critics have described the solo as "lengthy, mind-melting" and "an emotional apocalypse of sound."

The subsequent five tracks have been described as "sour harmony-group meditations heavy with bass, keyboard and class consciousness," with the band exploring a "psychedelic/funk fusion." "Can You Get to That" features Isaac Hayes's backing vocal group Hot Buttered Soul, and contains elements of folk blues and gospel music. "You and Your Folks, Me and My Folks" explores interracial love and features electronically distorted drums. The track "Super Stupid" was described by Pitchfork as a "tale of a dumbass junkie set to a tune Black Sabbath would have been proud of." The 9-minute closing track "Wars of Armageddon" has been described as a "freak-out" jam, and makes use of "paranoid, psychedelic sound effects and crowd sounds." Popular music scholar Yuval Taylor described it as "a burning hot prefiguring" of the music that Miles Davis would perform on his 1975 live album Agharta.

Release

Title and packaging
Reportedly, "Maggot Brain" was the nickname of Hazel. Other sources say the title is a reference to band leader George Clinton finding his brother's "decomposed dead body, skull cracked, in an apartment in Newark, New Jersey."

The cover artwork depicts a screaming black woman's head coming out of the earth; it was photographed by Joel Brodsky and features model Barbara Cheeseborough. The album's liner notes are a polemic on fear provided by the Process Church of the Final Judgement, an obscure Satanist religious cult. According to author Rickey Vincent, the organization's presumed association with mass-murderer Charles Manson, along with the album's foreboding themes and striking artwork, lent Funkadelic the image of a "death-worshipping black rock band."

Commercial performance and aftermath 
Westbound Records released Maggot Brain in July 1971. It peaked at number 108 on the US pop chart while missing the UK chart, and also reached the top 20 of the R&B charts.

After the album was released, the band effectively disbanded: drummer Tiki Fulwood was fired due to drug use; guitarist Tawl Ross reportedly got into an "acid eating contest, then snorting some raw speed, before completely flipping out" and has not performed since; bassist Billy Nelson quit over a money dispute with Clinton. Subsequently, only Clinton, Hazel, and keyboardist Bernie Worrell remained from the original Funkadelic lineup.

A 2005 reissue included three bonus tracks, among them an alternate mix of "Maggot Brain" featuring the full-band performance.

Reception

Initial reviews
Reviewing for Rolling Stone in September 1971, Vince Aletti negatively described Maggot Brain as "a shattered, desolate landscape with few pleasures," competently performed but "limited." He was particularly critical of the record's second side, panning it as "dead-end stuff," and asked "who needs this shit?" Village Voice critic Robert Christgau was more enthusiastic, praising the title-track as "druggy, time-warped super-schlock" and claiming that the second track features "a rhythm so pronounced and eccentric it could make Berry Gordy twitch to death"; he added that "the funk pervades the rest of the album, but not to the detriment of other peculiarities."

Legacy

Writing years later for PopMatters, Taylor called the album "one of the loudest, darkest, most intense records ever made", and stated that the group "captured the odor of the age, the stench of death and corruption, the weary exhalation of America at its lowest." Dominque Leone of Pitchfork called the album "an explosive record, bursting at the seams with exactly the kind of larger than life sound a band called Funkadelic should have made." Dave Segal, from the same publication, revered it as "a monument of psychedelic funk" and "a defining document of Black rock music in the early '70s". Additionally, he called its two bookending tracks "the most evocative expressions of birth and annihilation ever put on record" and suggested that the "soulful funk-rock" tracks in between represent the "hott[est] five-song streak in the Clinton canon". The Greenwood Encyclopedia of Rock History (2006) claimed that Maggot Brain and Funkadelic's previous two albums "created a whole new kind of psychedelic rock with a dance groove". Music historian Bob Gulla hailed it as an "iconoclastic funk-rock" record, featuring the best guitar playing of Hazel's career. Author Matthew Grant describes the album as marking where "the band really hit their stride.

In a subsequent review for Blender, Christgau described the 10-minute title track as "indelible" and said the album culminated in "Funkadelic's most incendiary freak-out ever" on the last track, while also applauding the 2005 CD reissue's bonus tracks. Stereogum named it the second best album by the Parliament-Funkadelic collective, and called it "one of the most cathartic R&B albums ever made." John Bush of AllMusic stated that the group "hit its stride with [the] acid-rock extravaganza." Happy Mag named the album among the 5 best P-Funk releases, describing it as "an absolute freakout of psychedelic funk sounds", but also "perhaps Clinton’s most lyrically sparse album". Fender called the album "an eruption of psychedelic agit-funk that blended the increasingly bleak American story—urban decay, prime time body counts from an ongoing slog through Vietnam, and front page assassinations—with the sounds of Hendrix, Motown, James Brown, Cream, Sly Stone, Blue Cheer and Vanilla Fudge." The Washington Post critic Geoffrey Himes names it an exemplary release of the progressive soul development from 1968 to 1973.

Maggot Brain was also influential to subsequent artists. Vernon Reid of the band Living Colour said, "'Maggot Brain' is a magnum opus of rock 'n' roll." Michael Melchiondo of the band Ween said, "When I heard 'Maggot Brain,' it was like, [...] there's this whole other thing, and it's even better, and there's more of it. And I can go see it live, and there's nine guitar players that are this good. So that was the hugest, hugest deal." Melchiondo paid tribute to Eddie Hazel on the Ween instrumental "A Tear for Eddie", which appeared on the band's Chocolate and Cheese album. The Mars Volta's Amputechture album featured a "Maggot Brain"-inspired solo on the song "Vicarious Atonement". Jazz musician Angel Bat Dawid also drew influence from Funkadelic and "Maggot Brain". The alternative rock band Sleigh Bells sampled "Can You Get To That?" in their hit song "Rill Rill". Rapper Esham, a pioneer of horrorcore, sampled "You and Your Folks, Me and My Folks" and "Super Stupid" on his 1990 song "Red Rum". Rapper Redman pays tribute to the Maggot Brain cover art in the art for his album Dare Iz a Darkside, which contains a song called "Cosmic Slop", which takes its name from the Funkadelic album of the same name.  Childish Gambino's album Awaken, My Love! drew influence from the Maggot Brain album, as did D'Angelo on his Black Messiah album, which The New York Times said "captured American unrest through the studio murk of Sly Stone, the fervor of Funkadelic and the off-kilter grooves somewhere between J Dilla and Captain Beefheart." "Super Stupid" was the only cover song recorded by the alternative metal band Audioslave, who were influenced by Funkadelic. André 3000 of the hip hop group Outkast said of Maggot Brain, "That album blew my mind. It made me want to learn to play guitar, and its huge range of styles — funk, bluegrass, country, opera — helped build our sound." The singer Bilal names it among his 25 favorite albums, citing its "loose" creative direction as an influence on his own music.

In 2003, Rolling Stone ranked Maggot Brain #486 on the magazine's list of 500 Greatest Albums of All Time, with the magazine raising its rank in 2012 to #479, calling it "the heaviest rock album the P-Funk ever created". In the 2020 reboot of the list, the album's rank shot up to #136. The record was also listed in the music reference book 1001 Albums You Must Hear Before You Die.

Track listing

 Sides one and two were combined as tracks 1–7 on CD reissues.

Personnel
Credits are adapted from the album's liner notes.

Funkadelic
 George Clinton – vocals, (lead vocals on tracks 1, 6, 7)
 Raymond Davis – vocals (lead vocals on track 2)
 Fuzzy Haskins, Calvin Simon, Grady Thomas, Garry Shider, Hot Buttered Soul (Pat Lewis, Diane Lewis and Rose Williams) – vocals
 Eddie Hazel – guitar, vocals (lead vocals on track 5)
 Tawl Ross – guitar, vocals (co-lead vocals on track 6, 7)
 Bernie Worrell – keyboards, vocals (lead vocals on track 3)
 Billy Nelson – bass guitar, vocals (lead vocals on track 4)
 Tiki Fulwood – drums

Production
Produced by George Clinton
Executive producer – Armen Boladian
Bernie Mendelson in charge of The Eegangas
Cover photography by Joel Brodsky
Inside cover photography by Ron Scribner
Artwork design – The Graffiteria/Paula Bisacca
Art direction – David Krieger
Album supervision – Bob Scerbo
Album co-ordination – Dorothy Schwartz
Model on album cover- Barbara Cheeseborough

Charts
Billboard (North America) - album
 1971   Pop Albums               No. 108
 1971   Black Albums             No. 14
 1990   Top R&B/Hip-Hop Albums   No. 92

References

External links
 
 the Motherpage

Funk rock albums by American artists
Psychedelic funk albums
Psychedelic rock albums by American artists
Westbound Records albums
1971 albums
Funkadelic albums